Elena Macovei (born 12 March 1963) is a Romanian sports shooter. She competed in the women's 25 metre pistol event at the 1984 Summer Olympics.

References

1963 births
Living people
Romanian female sport shooters
Olympic shooters of Romania
Shooters at the 1984 Summer Olympics
Place of birth missing (living people)